Ding Meiyuan (born 27 February 1979 in Dalian, Liaoning) is a female Chinese weightlifter. She started training at age 12, and joined the provincial team.

She won a gold medal in the women's +75 kg event at the 2000 Summer Olympics.

References

 China Daily

External links 
 
 
 
 
 

1979 births
Living people
Chinese female weightlifters
Olympic weightlifters of China
Olympic gold medalists for China
Olympic medalists in weightlifting
Weightlifters at the 2000 Summer Olympics
Medalists at the 2000 Summer Olympics
Asian Games medalists in weightlifting
Asian Games gold medalists for China
Weightlifters at the 1998 Asian Games
Medalists at the 1998 Asian Games
Sportspeople from Dalian
Weightlifters from Liaoning
World Weightlifting Championships medalists
20th-century Chinese women
21st-century Chinese women